"The Sex Is Good" is a song by American rock band Saving Abel, released as the second single from their second studio album Miss America (2010).

Charts

Weekly charts

Year-end charts

Release history

References

2010 songs
Saving Abel songs
Virgin Records singles
Songs written by Skidd Mills